"Lately" is a song by Canadian rapper Nav. It was released through XO and Republic Records on February 10, 2023, as the lead single from his upcoming third commercial mixtape Nav 2. It was solely written and produced by Nav himself.

Composition and lyrics
Over a "faint spacey" instrumental led by organ, Nav expresses his desire to be alone: "Lately, I just wanna be by myself / I can't hold it in, it's burnin' (Burnin') / I'm the only one that's earnin' / So let me do what I want (Yeah)".

Charts

References

2023 singles
2023 songs
Nav (rapper) songs
Songs written by Nav (rapper)
Song recordings produced by Nav (rapper)
XO (record label) singles
Republic Records singles